Arjan Veurink (born 23 September 1986) is a Dutch football coach who serves as the assistant coach of the England women's national team. He previously served as the head coach of FC Twente women and assistant coach of the Netherlands women's national football team.

Career

FC Twente Women 
In 2012, he was appointed as the head coach of FC Twente women at the age of 25. He served as the head coach until 2016. During his four-year tenure, he led the team to four titles, as well as the KNVB Cup and qualification for the UEFA Women's Champions League. He led them past the round of 32 in 2013–14, 2014–15 and 2015–16.

Netherlands Women (assistant coach) 
In 2017, he began serving as the assistant coach of the Netherlands women's national football team under Sarina Wiegman. The duo led the Netherlands to the European title in the same year and reached the final of the 2019 FIFA Women's World Cup in France.

England Women (assistant coach) 
With Sarina Wiegman, being appointed as the head coach of the England women's national Football team on a four-year contract in August 2020, he was set to follow suit to serve as her assistant. In January 2021, the Royal Dutch Football Association approved her request for Veurink to move along with her as she was set to start her role in September 2021 after the delayed 2020 Summer Olympics in Tokyo.

Honours 
Manager

FC Twente

 BeNe League: 2012–13, 2013–14
 Dutch championship: 2012–13,* 2013–14,* 2014–15,  2015–16
 KNVB Cup: 2014–15
Assistant manager

 Netherlands Women

 UEFA Women's Championship: 2017
 FIFA Women's World Cup runner-up: 2019

 England Women

 UEFA Women's Championship: 2022
 Arnold Clark Cup: 2022

Notes

*During the BeNe League period (2012 to 2015), the highest placed Dutch team is considered as national champion by the Royal Dutch Football Association.

References 

Dutch football managers
Women's association football managers
Dutch expatriate football managers
Expatriate football managers in England
FC Twente (women) managers
Living people
1986 births
People from Ommen
Sportspeople from Overijssel
Dutch expatriate sportspeople in England
21st-century Dutch people